Françoise Meunier is a Belgian medical doctor and former director general of the European Organisation for Research and Treatment of Cancer (EORTC).

Biography
Françoise Meunier graduated as a medical doctor at the Université Libre de Bruxelles (ULB) in 1974 and obtained a Master of Medical Oncology at the ULB in 1976. In 1977 she certified before the Educational Commission for Foreign Medical Graduates (ECFMG) in the United States. She obtained a Fulbright Prize in 1977 and in 1977 and 1978 worked as a research fellow at the Memorial Sloan-Kettering Cancer Center in New York City (United States). She obtained a Master in Internal Medicine at the ULB in 1979 and a PhD and Venia legendi in 1985. In 1990 she obtained a Certificate in Hospital Hygiene at the ULB.

In 1994, she became a Fellow of the Royal College of Physicians (FRCP) in the United Kingdom and in 1995 a Fellow (by distinction) of the Faculty of Pharmaceutical Medicine (Royal Colleges of Physicians). In 2001 she became a member of the Belgian College of Pharmaceutical Medicine (BCPM) and in 2003 graduated as Specialist in Health Database Management (Belgian Health Ministry). As of 2006, she is a member of the Académie Royale de Médecine de Belgique.

Awards and honours
 Fulbright Prize (1977)
 Research Fellow of the Memorial Sloan-Kettering Cancer Center, New York City (1977 and 1978)
 Fellow of the Royal College of Physicians (FRCP) – Great Britain (1994)
 Fellow of the Faculty of Pharmaceutical Medicine (Royal Colleges of Physicians) – Great Britain (1995)
 Membre of the Collège belge de Médecine Pharmaceutique (BCPM) (2001)
 Belgian Laureate Prix Femmes d'Europe 2004-2005.
 Member of the Académie Royale de Médecine de Belgique (since 2006)
 Pezcoller-ECCO Prize for her contributions to Oncology (2009)

She was raised to the rank of baroness by Albert II in 2007.

See also
 Belgian Cancer Registry Foundation

External links
 Françoise Meunier
 Speech of Dr. Françoise Meunier, laureate of the prize Women of Europe Brussels, 13 July 2005
 Because clinical research is fundamental

Year of birth missing (living people)
Living people
Belgian oncologists
Belgian women physicians
Université libre de Bruxelles alumni
Fellows of the Royal College of Physicians
Health informaticians
Belgian healthcare managers